Robert Leffler (9 January 1866 – 15 March 1940) was a German actor, film director and opera singer (bass).

Selected filmography 
 The Haunted Castle (1921)
 The Fear of Women (1921)
 Rose of the Asphalt Streets (1922)
 A Dying Nation (1922)
 The Circle of Death (1922)
 The Man of Steel (1922)
 The Expulsion (1923)
 The Secret of Brinkenhof (1923)
 The Comedian's Child (1923)
 Friedrich Schiller (1923)
 Wilhelm Tell (1923)
 Comedy of the Heart (1924)
 By Order of Pompadour (1924)
 Horrido (1924)
 A Free People (1925)
 The Island of Dreams (1925)
 Bismarck (1925)
 Comedians (1925)
 The Blackguard (1925)
 Goetz von Berlichingen of the Iron Hand (1925)
 The Good Reputation (1926)
 Derby (1926)
 The Clever Fox (1926)
 Only a Dancing Girl (1926)
 Watch on the Rhine (1926)
 Two and a Lady (1926)
 The Adventurers (1926)
 Sister Veronika (1927)
 Carnival Magic (1927)
 Bismarck 1862–1898 (1927)
 The Harbour Bride (1927)
 The Old Fritz (1928)
 Roses Bloom on the Moorland (1929)
 Crucified Girl (1929)
 A Mother's Love (1929)
 Elisabeth of Austria (1931)
 Uncle Bräsig (1936)

References

External links 

1866 births
1940 deaths
People from Aschersleben
German male film actors
German male silent film actors
Film directors from Saxony-Anhalt
German operatic basses
19th-century German male opera singers
20th-century German male opera singers
20th-century German male actors